Qillqata (Aymara qillqaña to write, -ta a suffix to indicate the participle, "written" or "something written",  Hispanicized Quelcata) is a mountain in the Andes of Peru, about  high. It is located southeast of Lake Salinas in the Arequipa Region, Arequipa Province, Tarucani District, and in the Moquegua Region, General Sánchez Cerro Province, Coalaque District. Some of the highest mountains near Qillqata are Wilani in the northeast, Q'uwa Laki in the southeast and Pachakutiq.

See also 
 Takuni

References

Mountains of Peru
Mountains of Moquegua Region